Joseph Vance may refer to:
 Joseph Vance (Ohio politician) (1786–1852), governor of Ohio
 Joseph W. Vance (1841–1927), American soldier and  Adjutant General of Illinois
 Joseph Williams Vance Jr. (1918–1942), officer in the United States Navy
 Joseph McArthur Vance (1868–1948), American architect
 Joseph Vance (priest), Anglican priest in Ireland